Silvassa is a city and municipality in western India, and the headquarters of the Dadra and Nagar Haveli district. It was a part of the former Portuguese Goa and Damaon, and is today the largest city in Dadra and Nagar Haveli and Daman and Diu. Many large companies have established their manufacturing units there. The city has a large number of factories providing significant government revenue, which allows the city to maintain a low level of taxation. The city was chosen as one of the hundred Indian cities in Government of India's flagship Smart Cities Mission.

Etymology
The former name of the place during Portuguese rule was Vila de Paço d'Arcos.

History
Until the end of the 19th century, Silvassa was just one of many small villages in Portuguese India. Its importance started to grow in 1885, when the Portuguese Administration, under Governor Carlos Eugénio Correia da Silva, decided to transfer the seat of Pragana Nagar Avely from Darará to further inland. By decree of 11 February 1885, Silvassa was created as a town, with the name of Vila de Paço d'Arcos. However, the original name prevailed and the town continued to be mainly known as Silvassa and referred to as such in official documents. It continued to stay the district capital until the Indian Annexation of 1954.

Demographics
According to the 2011 India census, Silvassa had a population of 98,265.

Language 
Gujarati and Hindi are the commonly spoken languages. Since the city lies in the northern part of Nagar Haveli, Gujarati language and its dialects are widely spoken as compared to the southern part of Nagar Haveli where Marathi, Konkani and its dialects hold prominence. Silvassa, being a cosmopolitan, is home to people from every part of India and hence every Indian language is spoken here such as Hindi, Marathi, Gujarati, Bhojpuri, Odia, Malayalam, Bengali, Kannada, Marwadi etc. A former Portuguese colony, Silvassa has a significant Roman Catholic population. There are still a few people who speak Portuguese as their first language.

Industry

Far from being a tribal region, Silvassa has now developed into an industrial hub with major industrial companies setting up manufacturing bases in the region. Its initial tax-free status granted by the Indian government to boost industrial investment in the former Union Territory of Dadra and Nagar Haveli has contributed to the region's industrial growth. The industrial landscape of Silvassa and surrounding region has been altered dramatically. It is one of the largest states in collection of excise duty from more than 3,500 small and medium industries. Silvassa is a big hub for plastic products and its products are found throughout India thanks to their good quality and low cost. Apart from all this, Silvassa is also known for various FMCG distributors like Gajra Distribution having reach throughout the country.

Silvassa hosts more than 200,000 floating population, coming from all parts of the country; the laborers mostly hail from Uttar Pradesh, Bihar and Orissa. Other floating community is from the states of Madhya Pradesh, Maharashtra, Gujarat, Kerala, Karnataka, Tamil Nadu, Andhra Pradesh, and Rajasthan.

Transport and connections

Silvassa is connected to Maharashtra and Gujarat via National Highway 848A. Silvassa has a well-maintained road network. Daman is 30 km away via Bhilad on National Highway number 8. Mumbai is 160 km away from Silvassa, via Bhilad, on National Highway number 8 Surat is 130 km away from Silvassa, via Bhilad, on National Highway number 8. Auto-rickshaw services ply between Vapi and Silvassa at a regular interval and easily available from Vapi (E) railway station. Gujarat Road Transport Buses ply between Silvassa and Vapi at a regular interval.

Silvassa Smart City Limited currently operates 10 Electric Buses to and from the Silvassa Bus Stand, destinations include Daman, Vapi, Khanvel, Dudhani, and Mandoni.

See also
 Portuguese India
Dadra and Nagar Haveli
Dadra and Nagar Haveli and Daman and Diu
Annexation of Dadra and Nagar Haveli
Amli

References

 
Cities and towns in Dadra and Nagar Haveli